Med-View Airline was a Nigerian airline headquartered and based in Lagos.

History
The airline was founded in 2007 as a charter airline, mainly operating Hajj flights, and has offered domestic passenger services since November 2012. It had since expanded into regional and long-haul scheduled passenger routes. Med-View Airline Plc was listed on the Nigerian Stock Exchange on January 31, 2017.

The airline laid off 90% of its employees between November 2017 and June 2018. Med-View Airline sacked and owes existing workers at least N1.5billion in salary arrears, pension and other entitlements. In April 2018, Medview Airline suspended international flight operations mostly due to debts and decreased aircraft. By October 2018, Medview had reportedly sacked over 100 staff some of who were owed about 6 months salaries. As of August, 2019 Medview reportedly shutdown all operations as its only operating aircraft went out of service. The airline was the only Nigerian airline to be listed in the list of air carriers banned in the European Union.

As of November 2022, Nigerian authorities confirmed that the airline no longer holds a valid air operator certificate.

Destinations
As of February 2015, Med-View Airline had operated nine domestic and nine international scheduled destinations in states across Nigeria, West Africa, Europe, and the Middle East:

Fleet

The Med-View Airline fleet includes the following aircraft as of February 2021:

References

External links

Airlines banned in the European Union
Defunct airlines of Nigeria
Companies based in Lagos
Airlines established in 2004
Nigerian companies established in 2004